The 2013 Moorilla Hobart International was a tennis tournament played on outdoor hard courts. It was the 20th edition of the event and part of the WTA International tournaments of the 2013 WTA Tour. It took place at the Hobart International Tennis Centre in Hobart, Australia from 6 through 12 January 2013.

Single main-draw entrants

Seeds

1 Rankings as of 31 December 2012.

Other entrants
The following players received wildcards into the singles main draw:
  Ashleigh Barty
  Bojana Bobusic
  Jarmila Gajdošová

The following players received entry from the qualifying draw:
  Lara Arruabarrena Vecino
  Lauren Davis
  Sílvia Soler Espinosa
  Mandy Minella

The following players received entry as lucky losers:
  Nina Bratchikova
  María Teresa Torró Flor

Withdrawals
Before the tournament
  Petra Cetkovská
  Anabel Medina Garrigues (abdominal injury)
  Anastasia Pavlyuchenkova (left hip injury)
  Heather Watson (elbow injury)

Doubles main-draw entrants

Seeds

1 Rankings as of 31 December 2012.

Other entrants
The following pairs received wildcards into the doubles main draw:
  Vanessa Dobson /  Karolina Wlodarczak
  Alyssa Hibberd /  Joanna Smith

Withdrawals
Before the tournament
  Anabel Medina Garrigues (abdominal injury)
During the tournament
  Klára Zakopalová (ankle injury)

Champions

Singles

  Elena Vesnina def.  Mona Barthel, 6–3, 6–4

Doubles

   Garbiñe Muguruza /  María Teresa Torró Flor def.  Tímea Babos /  Mandy Minella, 6–3, 7–6(7–5).

References
Official website

 
Moorilla Hobart International
Moorilla Hobart International
Hobart International